Martin Fondse (February 20, 1967, Bergen Op Zoom) is a Dutch pianist and composer. He also plays the vibrandoneon, the baroque version of the melodica. He is a composer and arranger in the fields of jazz and contemporary music and he leads the Martin Fondse Orchestra (formerly known as 'Starvinsky Orkestar').

Discography 
 Fragrant Moondrops (Basta, 2009)
 XLJazz 2010 (Buitenkunst, 2010)
 Testimoni (Basta, 2012)

Filmography 
 2004 Vent - Erik van Schaaik (Music: Martin Fondse)
 2007 Soufiane - Natasja André de la Porte  (Music: Martin Fondse)
 2007 Dennis P. - Pieter Kuijpers (arrangement title song: Martin Fondse)
 2008 The Phantom of the Cinema- Erik van Schaaik (Music: Martin Fondse)
 2010 Witte Hond - Natasja André de la Porte  (Music: Martin Fondse)
 2010 Pecker - Erik van Schaaik (Music: Martin Fondse)
 2010 Overmorgen - Natasja André de la Porte  (Music: Martin Fondse)
 2011 My Long Distance Friend - Carina Molier (additional music: Martin Fondse)
 2011 Audition - Udo Prinsen (Music: Eric Vloeimans & Martin Fondse)
 2013 Fallin' Floyd - Albert 't Hooft & Paco Vink (Music: Martin Fondse)

Awards 
 2014 Best Short Film  Adult Jury & Young Jury Young About International Film festival, Bologna. Fallin' Floyd - (Albert 't Hooft & Paco Vink Music: Martin Fondse)
 2013 VNAP Vakprijs Holland Animation FIlm Festival Fallin' Floyd - (Albert 't Hooft & Paco Vink Music: Martin Fondse)
 2013 Audience Award Holland Animation Film Festival, Fallin' Floyd - (Albert 't Hooft & Paco Vink Music: Martin Fondse)
 2013 Best 2D Animation Neum Animated Film Festival, Fallin' Floyd - (Albert 't Hooft & Paco Vink Music: Martin Fondse)
 2012 Edison Award Jazz National
 2011 Best International Film Black Rock Animation Film Festival, Dublin, Ireland - Audition (Director: Udo Prinsen Music: Eric Vloeimans & Martin Fondse)
 2011 Best Animation Award Leids Film Festival - Audition (Director: Udo Prinsen Music: Eric Vloeimans & Martin Fondse)
 2009 Dutch entry for the Oscars, Animated Shorts (USA) - Phantom of the Cinema (Direction: Erik van Schaaik Music: Martin Fondse)
 2009 Grand Prize and Trophy at Anim’est international film festival Romania - Phantom of the Cinema (Direction: Erik van Schaaik Music: Martin Fondse)
 2009 Winner of the Grand Prize and Trophy at Anim’est international film festival Romania - Phantom of the Cinema (Direction: Erik van Schaaik Music: Martin Fondse)
 2007 Award Francisco Garcia De Paso, Huesca International Short Film Festival (ES) - Soufiane (director: Natasja André de la Porte Music: Martin Fondse)
 2006 International Working Animated Film Festival RFAF 2006 (Bosnia- Herzegovina) - Best music (Vent)
 2005 Cinanima Espinho 2005 (Portugal) - Best music (Vent)
 2004 Fipresci award, Annecy, France - Vent (Direction: Erik van Schaaik Music: Martin Fondse)
 2004 1st prize at the International Festival of animationfilms Bimini in Latvia Vent (Direction: Erik van Schaaik Music: Martin Fondse)
 2004 Nominated best short film and best sound design at the Holland Film Meeting 2004 - Vent (Direction: Erik van Schaaik Music: Martin Fondse)
 2004 Grand Prix for best short film at  The Kyoto Kinder Film Fest - Vent (Direction: Erik van Schaaik Music: Martin Fondse)
 2002 Nominated for Bird Award, artist deserving wider recognition, North Sea Jazz festival
 1998 2nd Prize Euror' Jazz Big Band Association, Paris, France
 1996 1st Prize Julius Hemphill Award (Jazz Composers Alliance), Boston, USA 
 1993 3rd Prize Euro Jazz Contest, Hoeilaart, Belgium

Composition commissions 

 2014 'Rosefire': new songs for mezzo-soprano, trumpet, piano & string quartet
 2014 ZomerOrkest Nederland - Twin Moon Rising
 2014 World Trombone Quartet - new work
 2014 Matangi Quartet - new work
 2013  'The Bridge' for Martin Fondse Orchestra & Lenine: new instrumental music and arrangements of Lenine's favourites
 2011 'Far, East, South' for Doelenensemble Rotterdam & Steffen Schorn
 2010 New Composition for Clazz Ensemble, in collaboration with Jacob TV
 2009 'Uncle M.' for Royal Concertgebouw Orchestra & Eric Vloeimans
 2009 '4 Seasons in 1 Day', composition for Doudou N'Diaye Rose, Saxophone Quartet (Artvark), Drums (Peter Erskine), Bass (Eric van der Westen), Percussion Ensemble (Anumadutchi)
 2009 Half/Half for Gelders Fanfare Orkest & eric Vloeimans
 2009 Bollywood Medley for Amstel Saxophone Quartet & [Niti Ranjan Biswas]
 2009 Theatre Music for Boogaerdt/vanderSchoot: Martha Loves George
 2008 Composition for 'Sintonize', project of modern dance company Cisne Negro, São Paulo and Silent Disco (NL)
 2006 'Primer Dark' for Symphonic Orchestra & Clarinet Solo for Holland Symfonia (NL) & Claudio Puntin
 2006 'Swinging Old Lady' for Nederlandse Muziekdagen - Work for Tania kross, Izaline Callister & Metropole Orchestra
 2005 'Fester' for Doelenensemble Rotterdam & Eric Vloeimans
 2004 'City Lights', Suite for Jazz Orchestra & Trumpet Solofor HR Big Band, Frankfurt (De) & Eric Vloeimans
 2003 'All in the Family', composition commission from Jazz international Rotterdam (NL)
 2003 'Cottacatya!', Suite for Jazz Orchestra for HR Big Band, Frankfurt (De)
 2002 'Cactus', The Annual Composition Commission from North Sea Jazz Festival (NL)

Collaborations 

 2013 Martin Fondse Orchestra & Lenine: 'The Bridge'
 2012 Martin Fondse Orchestra & Roberto Sion: 'Homelands'
 2012 Gregory Porter & Metropole Orchestra - arrangements
 2011 Martin Fondse Orchestra & Matthew Herbert, November Music (NL)
 2004 Vernon Reid & Metropole Orchestra - Holland Festival (NL), compositions, arrangements
 2004 Manu Dibango & Metropole Orchestra - Dunya Festival (NL), compositions
 2003 Pat Metheny & Metropole Orchestra - arrangements
 1999 Carleen Anderson & Metropole Orchestra - arrangements

References

External links 

1967 births
Living people
Dutch composers
Dutch jazz composers
Dutch jazz pianists
Jazz arrangers
People from Bergen op Zoom
21st-century pianists